Ariel Zerrudo is a Filipino footballer who has played for the Philippines national football team

Career
Zerrudo played for the Philippines at the 2004 AFF Championship. He was also part of the Philippine squad that participated at the 2007 AFF Championship qualifiers where he scored a goal in the 7-0 rout of Timor Leste. He was part of the squad that participated in the final tournament.

He also played for the Philippines national futsal team having part of the team that played at the 2007, 2008, and 2010 AFF Futsal Championships. He also played in the 2012 AFC Futsal Championship qualifiers.

References

Living people
Filipino footballers
Philippines international footballers
Filipino men's futsal players
Pasargad F.C. players
1981 births
Association football midfielders